Leave a Mark is the fifth studio album by American country music artist John Michael Montgomery. The tracks "Love Working on You", "Cover You in Kisses", and "Hold On to Me" were all released as singles, reaching numbers 14, 3, and 4, respectively, on the Hot Country Songs charts. Overall, the album was certified gold by the RIAA for shipments of 500,000 copies in the United States.

The title track was later recorded by Elbert West (who co-wrote it) on his 2001 debut album Livin' the Life. "You're the Ticket" was later released by Billy Hoffman from his 2000 album All I Wanted Was You.

Track listing

Personnel

Mark Beckett – drums
Richard Bennett – electric guitar
Bruce Bouton – steel guitar, Dobro
Mike Brignardello – bass guitar
J. T. Corenflos – electric guitar
Vinnie Colaiuta – drums
Shannon Forrest – drums
Larry Franklin – fiddle
Paul Franklin – steel guitar, Dobro
Dann Huff – electric guitar
Brent Mason – electric guitar
Gene Miller – background vocals
John Michael Montgomery – lead vocals 
Phil Naish – keyboards, piano
Steve Nathan – keyboards, piano
Chris Rodriguez – background vocals
Brent Rowan – electric guitar
John Wesley Ryles – background vocals
Michael Spriggs – acoustic guitar
Biff Watson – acoustic guitar
Curtis Young – background vocals
Reggie Young – electric guitar

Chart performance

Weekly charts

Year-end charts

References 

1998 albums
Atlantic Records albums
John Michael Montgomery albums